Mireya Agüero or Mireya Agüero de Corrales is a Honduran politician who served as minister for foreign affairs from 2013 to 2014.

Agüero has a law degree and a degree in international relations. She joined the civil service in 1981 and the foreign service in 1983.

She rose through the ranks and was made a Minister for Foreign Affairs for Honduras in May 2013. Agüero was appointed by President Porfirio Lobo following a brief period as Vice Minister to replace Arturo Corrales who had been moved to Minister of Security.

Agüero worked under the new President Juan Orlando Hernández the following year, but she tendered her resignation in 2014 and it took effect on 15 November.

In October 2015 it was announced that President Hernández was appointing Agüero's niece, María Dolores Agüero, to be the vice Minister of Foreign Affairs.

References

External links

Living people
Foreign Ministers of Honduras
Honduran women diplomats
Women government ministers of Honduras
Female foreign ministers
21st-century Honduran women politicians
21st-century Honduran politicians
Year of birth missing (living people)